Dr. Y.S.R. Horticultural University, formerly Andhra Pradesh Horticultural University, is a state university located at Venkataramannagudem, near Tadepalligudem in West Godavari district, Andhra Pradesh, India. It was established in 2007 by the Government of Andhra Pradesh and focuses on education and research of horticultural science.

History
Dr. Y.S.R. Horticultural University was established in 2007 by the Government of Andhra Pradesh as the Andhra Pradesh Horticultural University, together with three colleges of horticulture, at Venkataramannagudem in West Godavari district, Mojerla in Mahaboob Nagar district and Anantharajupet in Kadapa district, as well as some educational programmes which were offered under Acharya N. G. Ranga Agricultural University. It was originally managed by a government official until the appointment of the first Vice-Chancellor in 2008, when it became independent. It was renamed as Dr. Y.S.R. Horticultural University in 2011.

References

External links

State universities in Andhra Pradesh
Educational institutions established in 2007
2007 establishments in Andhra Pradesh
Universities and colleges in West Godavari district
Horticulture in India
Agricultural universities and colleges in Andhra Pradesh